The men's team sprint competition at the 2022 European Speed Skating Championships was held on 8 January 2022.

Results
The race was started at 14:30.

References

Men's team sprint